The Sherwood Sandstone Group is a Triassic lithostratigraphic group (a sequence of rock strata) which is widespread in Britain, especially in the English Midlands. The name is derived from Sherwood Forest in Nottinghamshire which is underlain by rocks of this age. It has economic importance as the reservoir of the Morecambe Bay gas field, the second largest gas field in the UK.

Geographical extent
These rocks are found in northwest England as far north as Carlisle (and extending just into Scotland around Annan and Gretna) and in the Vale of Eden and then extending down the Cumbrian coast into Lancashire and Cheshire. They are mostly obscured by superficial deposits but the highest coastal cliffs in northwest England at St Bees Head are formed in the St Bees Sandstone, the lowermost formation within the group.

In the northeast they extend from Hartlepool south through the Vale of Mowbray and the Vale of York, then south through Nottinghamshire into the English Midlands, though are very largely concealed by superficial sediments. They occur widely through the Midlands (though usually concealed) and notably in an outlier at Leek, Staffordshire. They extend south to the Severn Estuary and beyond there through Somerset to Budleigh Salterton on the coast of East Devon.

There are further occurrences in Northern Ireland north and east of Limavady, east of Cookstown, between Dungannon and Armagh and along the Lagan Valley beneath Belfast and Newtownards and on the Antrim coast.

The Group comprises different sequences in each of the various basins in which it is developed as described below.

Cheshire Basin rock succession

The sequence is most thickly developed in the Cheshire Basin, which also extends into north Shropshire. It comprises the following formations:

Helsby Sandstone Formation
The Helsby Sandstone Formation (named from the Cheshire village of Helsby where the type section is exposed at Helsby Hill) comprises around 250m thickness of sandstone with conglomerate and siltstone which occurs across the Cheshire Basin. Older literature includes it as part of the Lower Keuper Sandstone. It is often divided into an upper Frodsham Member and a lower Delamere Member. Faulted blocks of these rocks are largely responsible for the prominent west facing escarpment of the Mid Cheshire Ridge and the Helsby Sandstone is exposed in numerous localities here, southwards from Runcorn through Frodsham to Utkinton, spectacularly at the outlier of Beeston Castle hill and lastly within the Peckforton Hills.

Wilmslow Sandstone Formation
The Wilmslow Sandstone Formation (named from the town of Wilmslow in Cheshire) comprises up to 900m thickness of early Triassic sandstones with occasional siltstones. It was earlier known as the Upper Mottled Sandstone.
In Wirral, the 60m thick Thurstaston Sandstone Member and the 2m thick Thurstaston Hard Sandstone Bed are distinguished at the top of the sequence.

Chester Pebble Beds Formation
The Chester Pebble Beds Formation (named from the city of Chester) comprises sandstones with some conglomerates and siltstones of early Triassic age. It ranges from less than 90m to over 220m in thickness. It has been known in the past as the Bunter Pebble Beds. There are a couple of reference sections for this sequence in the vicinity of Chester.

Kinnerton Sandstone Formation
The Kinnerton Sandstone Formation (named from the twin villages of Higher and Lower Kinnerton on the England/Wales border west of Chester) is a sequence which ranges from 0m to over 150m thickness of largely aeolian sandstones of early Triassic age. It was formerly known as the Lower Mottled Sandstone.

English Midlands rock succession

Bromsgrove Sandstone Formation
The Bromsgrove Sandstone Formation (named from the town of Bromsgrove in Worcestershire) is early Triassic to Anisian in age and comprises variously coloured sandstones whose bases are frequently conglomeratic, together with mudstones and siltstones. The thickness of the formation is variable but reaches around 500m in the Worcester area. It is often encountered in older literature as the Lower Keuper Sandstone. The formation includes the Shepshed Sandstone Member.

Wildmoor Sandstone Formation
The Wildmoor Sandstone Formation (named from the Worcestershire locality of Wildmoor, north of Bromsgrove) is a 0 - 284m thick sequence of sandstones formerly known as the Upper Mottled Sandstone or Wildmoor Beds. It also includes some mudstones and siltstones.

Kidderminster Formation
The Kidderminster Formation (named from the Worcestershire town of Kidderminster) is a 0 - 200m thick sequence of conglomerates and sandstones previously known as either the Bunter Pebble Beds or the Kidderminster Conglomerate Formation.

Polesworth Formation
The Polesworth Formation (named from the Warwickshire village of Polesworth) is of ?Olenekian to Anisian age.

Moira Formation
The Moira Formation (named from the Leicestershire village of Moira) is of Induan/Olenekian age. Also encountered as the Hopwas or Moira Breccia.

Lenton Sandstone Formation
The Lenton Sandstone Formation (named from the Nottingham suburb of Lenton) is of Induan/Olenekian age.

Stafford Basin rock succession
The Stafford Basin includes the Kibbleston Formation (named from the Staffordshire locality of Kibbleston) which is underlain by the Wildmoor Formation which is in turn underlain by the Kidderminster Formation.

Needwood Basin rock succession
The rock succession in the Needwood Basin includes the Hollington Formation (named from the Staffordshire locality of Hollington) which is underlain by the Hawksmoor Formation (named from the Staffordshire locality of Hawksmoor) which includes the Hulme Member, a conglomerate and which is in turn underlain by the Huntley Formation (named from the Staffordshire locality of Huntley). They are all of Scythian age.

Cumbria rock succession
On the Cumbrian coast the Group comprises the Calder Sandstone Formation and the underlying St Bees Sandstone Formation. The former is around 500m thick and includes sandstones of both aeolian and fluviatile origin. The latter is between 400 and 600m thick and includes some siltstone and claystone beds. It overlies the varied lithologies of the Permian age Cumbrian Coastal Group. The Kirklinton Sandstone Formation in places overlies the Calder Sandstone Formation in the Carlisle and Vale of Eden basins of north and east Cumbria.  A sandstone which underlies Sellafield and Drigg is known as the Sellafield Member and is assigned to the Helsby Sandstone Formation.

Southwest England rock succession
The group is represented in Somerset and east Devon by the Otterton Sandstone and the underlying Budleigh Salterton Pebble Beds formations,.

References

Geological groups of the United Kingdom
Geologic formations of England
Geology of Nottinghamshire
Sandstone formations
Triassic England
Triassic System of Europe
Induan Stage
Olenekian Stage
Sherwood Forest